Aphilopota is a genus of moths in the family Geometridae described by Warren in 1899.

Species
Some species of this genus are:
Aphilopota alloeomorpha Prout, 1938
Aphilopota aspera Prout, 1938
Aphilopota calaria (C. Swinhoe, 1904)
Aphilopota cardinalli Prout, 1954
Aphilopota confusata (Warren, 1902)
Aphilopota conturbata (Walker, 1863)
Aphilopota cydno Prout, 1954
Aphilopota decepta Janse, 1932
Aphilopota dicampsis Prout, 1934
Aphilopota euodia Prout, 1954
Aphilopota exterritorialis (Strand, 1909)
Aphilopota fletcheriana Viette, 1975
Aphilopota immatura Prout, 1938
Aphilopota foedata (Bastelberger, 1907)
Aphilopota inspersaria (Guenée, 1858)
Aphilopota interpellans (Butler, 1875)
Aphilopota iphia Prout, 1954
Aphilopota mailaria (C. Swinhoe, 1904)
Aphilopota melanommata Prout, 1954
Aphilopota melanostigma (Warren, 1904)
Aphilopota nubilata Prout, 1954
Aphilopota ochrimacula (Warren, 1902)
Aphilopota otoessa Prout, 1954
Aphilopota patulata (Walker, 1863)
Aphilopota perscotia Prout, 1931
Aphilopota phanerostigma Prout, 1917
Aphilopota plethora Prout, 1938
Aphilopota reducta Viette, 1973
Aphilopota rubidivenis (Prout, 1922)
Aphilopota rufiplaga (Warren, 1902)
Aphilopota scapularia (Snellen, 1872)
Aphilopota semidentata Prout, 1931
Aphilopota semiusta (Distant, 1898)
Aphilopota sinistra Prout, 1954
Aphilopota subalbata (Warren, 1905)
Aphilopota seyrigi Viette, 1973
Aphilopota sinistra Prout, 1954
Aphilopota statuta Prout, 1954
Aphilopota strigosissima (Bastelberger, 1909)
Aphilopota subalbata (Warren, 1905)
Aphilopota symphronima Prout, 1954
Aphilopota triphasia Prout, 1954
Aphilopota vicaria (Walker, 1860)
Aphilopota viriditincta (Warren, 1905)

References
Warren, W. (1899). "New Drepanulidae, Thyrididae, and Geometridae from the Aethiopian region". Novitates Zoologicae. 6 (3): 288–312.

Nacophorini
Geometridae genera